Olaf Wilhelm Isaachsen (May 16, 1835 – September 22, 1893) was a Norwegian landscape and genre painter.

Biography
He was born in Mandal in  Vest-Agder county Norway. Isaachsen belonged to a branch of an affluent and educated merchant family from Kjos   in Kristiansand. He was  the son of jurist Daniel Peter Christian Isaachsen, grandson of politician Isaach Isaachsen and great-grandson of Daniel Isaachsen (1744-1813), a Norwegian shipbuilder . He was the uncle of physicist Daniel Isaachsen, scientist Haakon Isaachsen (1867–1936), painter Herman Willoch and naval officer Odd Isaachsen Willoch.

He attended Nissens Latin School in Christiania (now Oslo). He later studied under Joachim Frich  and Johannes Flintoe at the Royal School of Drawing from 1850, in Düsseldorf from 1854 to 1859, and in Paris under Thomas Couture (1859-1860) and Gustave Courbet (1861-1862).   After a visit to Italy he returned home in 1864 with a view to becoming an  artist with a strong focus on archeology and history. He ultimately settled in Kristiansand, although with frequent periods spent abroad.

His artistic style reflected  naturalism and in later years impressionism.  Isaachsen was regarded as one of Norway's more prominent artists and great colourist with motives of the coast landscape of Southern Norway. He also painted a wide range of portraits. Moreover, he found a full valid artistic expression in Setesdalen.  His art often reflected the valley's distinctive culture. He is represented with 24 works in the National Museum in Oslo (NM), former National Gallery of Norway.
The Regional Museum in Kristiansand, Sørlandets Kunstmuseum (SKMU) has 58 works.

Personal life
Isaachsen was a knowledgeable and courteous man, a mixture of observation and locals, who spoke fluent German, Dutch, English, French and Italian. He was married in 1864 to Antonie (Toni) John Prehr (1838-1870). The couple had four children – William (1865-1942), Eivind (1866-1926); Johanna Marie (1867-1872) and Harald (1869-1942). His wife  died of tuberculosis when only 32 years old. Two years later  his four-year-old daughter Johanna Marie died of diphtheria, and he was left with three small boys. He was the paternal grandfather of Sigurd Daniel Isaachsen Willoch, an art historian and director of the National Gallery of Norway.

Selected works

 En sjørøver, 1858 
 Seks akter fra Paris, 1859
 Landskap fra Apeninnene, 1863 
 Setesdalsstue, Kveste i Valle, 1866 
 Slagsmål i en bondestue, 1866 
 Studie av en såret mann, 1866
 Liggende setesdøl, 1866
 Ung setesdøl, 1866 
 Slagsbror, 1867 
 Et litterært funn, 1870–71 
 Bruden pyntes, 1878 
 Setesdalsloft, 1878 
 Stabbursinteriør fra Ose i Setesdal, 1878 
 Stuen i Holskogen, ca. 1880 
 Syrinbusk i morgensol, 1881 
 Tore Hund ved Olav den helliges lik, 1881 
 Venemyr i Søgne Sogn Høststemning, 1885 
 Efter badet, 1889 
 Kristiansand etter brannen, 1892 
 tre brannbilder fra Kristiansand, 1892

References

1835 births
1893 deaths
19th-century Norwegian painters
Oslo National Academy of the Arts alumni
Norwegian expatriates in Germany
Norwegian expatriates in France
Norwegian male painters
People from Mandal, Norway
19th-century Norwegian male artists